Aminoacylation is the process of adding an aminoacyl group to a compound.

See also
Acylation
tRNA aminoacylation
Transfer RNA-like structures

References

Organic reactions